The 1986 Tasmanian state election was held on 8 February 1986.

Retiring Members

Liberal
Ray Bonney MLA (Braddon)

Independent
Doug Lowe MLA (Franklin)

House of Assembly
Sitting members are shown in bold text. Tickets that elected at least one MHA are highlighted in the relevant colour. Successful candidates are indicated by an asterisk (*).

Bass
Seven seats were up for election. The Labor Party was defending three seats. The Liberal Party was defending four seats.

Braddon
Seven seats were up for election. The Labor Party was defending three seats. The Liberal Party was defending four seats.

Denison
Seven seats were up for election. The Labor Party was defending two seats. The Liberal Party was defending four seats, although sitting MP Gabriel Haros had been expelled from the party. The Australian Democrats had won a seat in 1982, but that seat had been filled in a recount by Independent Green Bob Brown.

Franklin
Seven seats were up for election. The Labor Party was defending three seats. The Liberal Party was defending three seats. One seat was held by the Independent former Premier, Doug Lowe.

Lyons
Seven seats were up for election. The Labor Party was defending three seats. The Liberal Party was defending four seats.

See also
 Members of the Tasmanian House of Assembly, 1982–1986
 Members of the Tasmanian House of Assembly, 1986–1989
 Results of the Tasmanian state election, 1986

References
Tasmanian Parliamentary Library

Candidates for Tasmanian state elections